Oscar Hiram Lipps (1872 - 1969) worked at the Carlisle Indian School in Pennsylvania, was superintendent of the Nez Perce Agency, was superintendent at the Chemawa Indian School, and was a field representative of the U. S. Indian Service. He wrote a two volume book on the Navajo. The University of Oregon has a collection of his papers.

Lipps was born in Fayette, Indiana. He studied in Harriman, Tennessee (American Temperance University?).

Lipps was the superintendent at the Carlisle School from July 1915 through March 1917 when he was succeeded by John Francis, Jr.

Bibliography
The Navajos, The Torch Press, Cedar Rapids, Iowa, The Torch press, 1909
The Navajo Volume I
The Navajo Volume II
Laws and regulations relating to Indians and their lands; compiled by Oscar H. Lipps, Lewiston Printing & Binding, Lewiston, Idaho, 1913
The Case of the California Indians, Chimewa, Oregon, School print shop, 40 pages, illustrated, 1932
Daily Lesson Plan Book for Vocational.Instructors, 1919
History of the Art of Weaving Among the Navajos, article published in the Red Man

References

1872 births
1969 deaths
Carlisle Indian Industrial School people
People from Boone County, Indiana